Czech Lion Award for Best Animated Film is an award given to the best Czech animated film. It was established in 2020.

Winners

References 

Animation awards
Czech Lion Awards
Awards established in 2020